Spirit world may refer to:

In religion
Spirit world (Spiritualism)
Spirit world (Latter Day Saints)
Goloka, or Vaikuntha, often referred to as the "spiritual sky" or "spiritual world" in Hare Krishna contexts
Guinee, a spirit world in Vodou
Dausos of Lithuanian mythology
The Dreaming of the Australian aborigines
The noosphere of Vladimir Vernadsky and Pierre Teilhard de Chardin

In media
The Spirit World, the 28th level of the video game Doom II
Umbra (World of Darkness), the spirit world of the role-playing game
Spirit World (Avatar: The Last Airbender), the parallel universe in the Nickelodeon animated television series Avatar: The Last Airbender
The Nevernever, the spirit world of The Dresden Files literature series.

See also
Astral plane
Heaven
Hell
Intermediate state, a person's interim existence between one's death and one's resurrection from the dead in Christian eschatology
Otherworld
Shamanism
Spirit
Spirituality
Spiritwalker (Native)
Underworld